The French Institute of the Near East (IFPO) is part of the network of French Research Centers abroad. It has branches in Syria,  Lebanon, Jordan, and Iraq.

History 

The IFPO was created in 2003 by bringing together three existing French Institutes in the area: IFEAD (French Institute for Arab Studies in Damascus, established in 1922), IFAPO (French Institute of Near Eastern Archaeology established in Syria and Lebanon in 1946) and CERMOC (Centre for Study and Research on the Contemporary Middle East, est. 1977 in Lebanon and 1988 in Jordan). The IFPO has the status of a "Joint Entity of French Research Institutes Abroad" (UMIFRE no6, Unité Mixte des Instituts français de recherche à l’étranger) and is under the aegis of the French Ministry of Foreign Affairs and the CNRS (National Centre for Scientific Research). In October 2010, the IFPO opened its center for research inside Erbil Citadel, the world’s oldest continuously inhabited settlement.

Fields of research and area purposes 

IFPO is active in Syria, Lebanon and Jordan, and hopes to be able to extend its activities to Iraq and the Palestinian Territories. Its Director-General, who is based in Damascus, is Eberhard Kienle, who was preceded by François Burgat (2008-2013), Jean-Yves L’Hôpital (June 2005-May 2008), and Christian Décobert (Jan. 2003-Aug. 2004). The Institute's tasks are research, research training, the diffusion of knowledge, and cooperation with local and international institutions. These tasks are carried out with the support of the local Ministries in charge of Research and Higher Education, and in close cooperation with both. 
 
The Institute acts as a center for study and research in all fields relating to the ancient and modern civilizations of the Near East. On the basis of the numerous activities and publications of its researchers, the institute aims at raising the French contribution to research to the highest academic standards in the various fields of research related to these civilizations, from the earliest times to the contemporary period. The institute also trains young researchers for careers in teaching and research.

Organization 

The institute is organized into three scientific departments: Archeology and Ancient History (Director Frédéric Alpi); Arab, Medieval and Modern Studies (director: Bruno Lory); Contemporary Studies (director: Myriam Catusse). 
 
In its different locations, the Institute recruits experienced researchers (at various levels in their careers) from France, from the three countries in which it is established, from Europe, and from the rest of the world. They come for a maximum of four years and are selected to take part in the various academic projects initiated by the institute. It also welcomes receives young researchers (PhD candidates, grant holders, etc.) of all nationalities to take part in its activities. The duration of their stay varies according to their individual situation.
 
The institute also awards some short-term grants for limited projects. Since many of these researchers also belong to other research teams or programs in France and elsewhere, the Institute hopes that these projects will strengthen and broaden its academic network.

External links 
 IFPO website
 IFPO's Digital publications
 IFPO's Open archives
 Syria on line
 Website of the French research centers abroad 
 library online catalog

References

Social science institutes
Archaeology of Syria
Government agencies of France
Asian studies
Institut Français